Manfred Purzer (born 13 April 1931) is a German screenwriter and film director. He wrote more than 20 films between 1955 and 1993. In 1974, he was a member of the jury at the 24th Berlin International Film Festival.

Selected filmography

Screenwriter

  (dir. Rolf Thiele, 1968) — based on a book by 
 Seven Days Grace (dir. Alfred Vohrer, 1969) — based on a novel by 
  (dir. Alfred Vohrer, 1969)
 The Sex Nest (dir. Alfred Vohrer, 1970) — based on a novel by 
  (dir. Alfred Vohrer, 1970)
  (dir. Zbyněk Brynych, 1970)
 Und Jimmy ging zum Regenbogen (dir. Alfred Vohrer, 1971) — based on a novel by Johannes Mario Simmel
  (dir. Ernst Hofbauer, 1971)
 Love Is Only a Word (dir. Alfred Vohrer, 1971) — based on a novel by Johannes Mario Simmel
 The Stuff That Dreams Are Made Of (dir. Alfred Vohrer, 1972) — based on a novel by Johannes Mario Simmel
 Tears of Blood (dir. Alfred Vohrer, 1972) — based on The Blizzard by Alexander Pushkin
 All People Will Be Brothers (dir. Alfred Vohrer, 1973) — based on a novel by Johannes Mario Simmel
 (dir. Alfred Vohrer, 1973) — based on a novel by Johannes Mario Simmel
 Three Men in the Snow (dir. Alfred Vohrer, 1974) — based on a novel by Erich Kästner
 One or the Other of Us (dir. Wolfgang Petersen, 1974) — based on a novel by 
 Only the Wind Knows the Answer (dir. Alfred Vohrer, 1975) — based on a novel by Johannes Mario Simmel
 To the Bitter End (dir. Gerd Oswald, 1975) — based on a novel by Johannes Mario Simmel
 Lili Marleen (dir. Rainer Werner Fassbinder, 1981)
  (dir. Harald Reinl, 1982)
  (dir. Rolf von Sydow, 1983)
  (dir. , 1993, TV film)
 Tödliche Diamanten (dir. , 1998, TV film)

Director
 The Net (1975) — based on a novel by Hans Habe
  (1976) — based on The Devil's Elixirs by E. T. A. Hoffmann
 The Man in the Rushes (1978) — based on a novel by 
  (1983)

References

External links

1931 births
Living people
Film people from Munich